Egekent is a station on İZBAN's Northern Line.

Disembarkation/embarkation of passengers with bicycles is prohibited at the station, despite the fact that the passage with bicycles in the Izmir commuter train and metro is asseptable. The station employees explain this by the fact that the station is not equipped with "ordinary" stairs. Exit / entrance to the stop island is carried out through escalators and elevators, and according to the rules of İZBAN, the transport of bicycles is prohibited in them.

Railway stations in İzmir Province
Railway stations opened in 2011
2011 establishments in Turkey